The 2017 ACBS Asian Snooker Championship was an amateur snooker tournament that took place from 22 April to 28 April 2017 in Doha, Qatar. It was the 33rd edition of the ACBS Asian Snooker Championship and also doubles as a qualification event for the World Snooker Tour.

The tournament was won by the number 2 seed Lyu Haotian of China who defeated Pankaj Advani 6–3 in the final to win the championship, as a result Lyu was given a two-year card on the professional World Snooker Tour for the 2017/2018 and 2018/2019 seasons.

Results

References

2017 in snooker
Snooker amateur tournaments
Sports competitions in Doha
2017 in Qatari sport
International sports competitions hosted by Qatar
April 2017 sports events in Asia